Gurminj Zavqibekov (May 1, 1929 - October 21, 2003) was a Tajik actor and musician.

Early life and education
Zavqibekov graduated from the Institute of Theatre and Art named after Aleksandr Ostrovsky in Tashkent in 1954. In 1977, he became the Director of the Lahuti State Academy of Dramatic Arts in Dushanbe.

Career

Film
Zavqibekov is partial to the portrayal of positive, decisive, upright, and kind heroes. A realist actor, he tends to
distance himself from flights of fancy and hyperbole. The roles he has performed include:

 Frunze in Hurriat (Freedom), by Gh. Abdullo, 1964;
 Ghafur in Boi va Khizmatgor (The Richman and the Servant), by Hamza Hakimzoda Niyozi, 1957;
 Mach and Akbar in Rudaki (Rudaki), by S. Ulughzoda, 1973;
 Urtaboev in the film Odam Pustashro Ivaz Mikunad (Man Changes His Skin), directed by R. Perlshtein, 1959;

Stage 
Zavqibekov's contribution to stage include:
 Saidali in Tufon (Storm), by Gh. Abdullo and Sh. Qiomov, 1957;
 Kent in Shoh Lir (King Lear), by W. Shakespeare, 1957;
 Kamol in Man—Fakhriddinov (I Am Fakhriddinov), by J. Ikromi, 1961;
 Rustam in Rustam va Suhrob (Rustam and Suhrab), by Gh. Abdullo, 1967; and many others.

Awards 
Zavqibekov became a People's Artist of Tajikistan and won the Rudaki State Prize in 1966.

Gurminj Museum 
The Gurminj Museum of Musical Instruments, better known as the Gurminj Museum, was established in 1990 by Gurminj as a result of long-pursued dream and expression of his passion for music and arts.

Personal life 
Zavqibekov was married to Tamara Pavlovna and had two sons: Iqbol and Genadiy. Iqbol is a professional musician, director of the renowned Group "Shams" and inherited to become the Director of the Gurminj Museum after his death. Gurminj Zavqibekov died in 2003 in Dushanbe.

References

External links 
 Museum of Traditional Musical Instruments named after Gurminj Zavqibekov
Photos of Gurminj Museum on Naison.tj

1929 births
2003 deaths
Tajikistani musicians
20th-century Tajikistani musicians
21st-century Tajikistani musicians
People from Gorno-Badakhshan Autonomous Region